Chi Hyun Chung (born 7 March 1970) is a Korean-Bolivian doctor, evangelical pastor and politician. He became notable in the country's media for his statements against the LGBT community. Chung was a candidate for the President of Bolivia for the Christian Democratic Party in the 2019 Bolivian general election and the candidate for the Front For Victory in the 2020 Bolivian general election. Due to his conservative ideology, some international media has described Chung as the "Bolivian Bolsonaro".

Biography
Chi Hyun Chung was born in the city of Gwangju, South Korea on 7 March 1970. Chung grew up in an evangelical family. In 1976, his family moved to live in Seoul. In 1982, the Korean Presbyterian Church sent the Chung family to Bolivia as evangelical missionaries.

The Chung family initially settled in the city of La Paz, later moving to Santa Cruz de la Sierra. Chung continued his secondary studies, graduating in 1988 from the Bolivian-Brazilian Baptist School. In 1989, Chung moved to Sucre to continue his higher education. That year, he entered the University of Saint Francis Xavier. He graduated in 1995 as a physician by profession. He returned to Santa Cruz de la Sierra to obtain his master's degree in higher education and his master's degree in health and public health management.

Outside of politics, Chung served as director of the UCEBOL clinic, as well as founding 70 Presbyterian churches in Bolivia. Chung is currently the president of the Presbyterian Church in Bolivia.

Chung defines himself as "a Christian capitalist" and considers Evo Morales "a centrist running a communist system". He holds very conservative positions, perceived as misogynistic and homophobic. He is in favour of a curfew for all minors, believes that "a woman should be educated to behave like one" and that homosexuals should receive psychiatric care to recover their "innate sexual identity". He attributed the increase in femicides in the country to "abuse by women against men".

References

1970 births
Bolivian evangelicals
Bolivian Presbyterians
Bolivian physicians
Bolivian politicians
Christian Democratic Party (Bolivia) politicians
Living people
People from Gwangju
South Korean evangelicals
South Korean Presbyterians
University of Charcas alumni
Evangelical pastors
South Korean emigrants to Bolivia
Protestant missionaries in Bolivia